Chandley Ovens, based in Greater Manchester, are a bakery engineering company, and one of the UK's leading manufacturer of commercial ovens for bakeries. The company was formed in 1944.

Structure
Tom Chandley Ltd is headquartered in Tameside near the M60/M67/A57 Denton Interchange in Denton, Greater Manchester on the Windmill Lane Industrial Estate.

Products
The company makes large commercial ovens for bakeries and fast-food outlets.
 Deck ovens
 Conveyor ovens

References

External links
 Chandley Ovens

1944 establishments in England
Companies based in Tameside
Cooking appliance brands
Engineering companies of England
Manufacturing companies established in 1944
British companies established in 1944
English brands